Donald Allen Wexler (January 23, 1926 – June 26, 2015) was an influential Mid-Century modern architect whose work is predominantly in the Palm Springs, California, area. He is known for having pioneered the use of steel in residential design.

Life and career
Wexler was born in Sioux Falls, South Dakota, in 1926 and raised in Minneapolis, Minnesota. He graduated from the University of Minnesota in 1950 and worked for Richard Neutra in Los Angeles, CA. He moved to Palm Springs in 1952 and practiced there for almost six decades, developing an architecture that is acutely sensitive to the extremes of the desert climate. In 1962, he designed the all-steel Alexander houses, along with the structural engineer Bernard Perlin for the developers George and Robert Alexander. His houses' framing, roofs and exterior siding are typically steel, with drywall interior siding. While he chose to keep his office small and limited his practice to the desert community, Wexler produced a body of work that included houses, schools, hotels, banks and the Palm Springs International Airport.

Legacy
A one time resident of Palm Springs, Wexler had a Golden Palm Star on the Palm Springs Walk of Stars dedicated to him in 2008. Archives of his work are kept at the Cal Poly Pomona College of Environmental Design. In 2011, the Palm Springs Art Museum organized the exhibition "Steel and Shade: The Architecture of Donald Wexler".

In 2011, developer Marnie McBryde presented plans to build up to 50 Wexler-designed houses, which are adaptations of the 1964 Palm Springs house he designed for Dinah Shore, throughout the Hamptons. In 2014, actor Leonardo DiCaprio purchased the original Dinah Shore residence in the Old Las Palmas neighborhood of Palm Springs for $5,230,000.

Wexler died at his home in Palm Desert on June 26, 2015 following a brief illness. He was 89.

References

Further reading
 

20th-century American architects
1926 births
University of Minnesota School of Architecture alumni
Architects from California
People from Sioux Falls, South Dakota
Artists from Palm Springs, California
2015 deaths
Architects from South Dakota
21st-century American architects